Akwamu-Atimpoku is a town in the Eastern Region of Ghana.

References 

Populated places in the Volta Region